The Women's Rugby League World Cup is an international rugby league tournament, contested by the women's national team of the International Rugby League (IRL). The competition has been held since 2000 in Great Britain and since 2008 has been part of the Festival of World Cups. Under the current format, eight teams are separated into two groups of four with the top two qualifying for the semis.

Throughout the five editions, the Women's Rugby League World Cup has been won by two teams. New Zealand has won three times while Australia has also won the title three times, including the most recent one (2021).

History

Background
Women's Rugby League had been played in both Oceania and the United Kingdom for several years but it was not until 1985 in Britain and 1993 in Australia and New Zealand where female only organizations and governing bodies were established and while the Rugby Football League recognized the British women in 1985 it took another five years for the Australian Rugby League to officially recognize the Australian Women's Rugby League. New Zealand Women's Rugby League were officially recognized by the governing body New Zealand Rugby League Inc in 1995. This is partially the reason for no Women's World Cup being held until the year 2000 when these organizations collectively came together to organize it.

Tournaments

The 2000 World Cup was held in England. The final was contested between Great Britain and New Zealand with New Zealand being crowned champions by a score of 26-4.

The 2003 World Cup was held in Albany, New Zealand and was contested by teams from Australi, Great Britain, Tokelau, Tonga, Cook Islands, Niue, Samoa, New Zealand Māori and New Zealand. New Zealand would eventually win the competition, beating New Zealand Maori by a score of 58-0.  New Zealand went through the tournament unbeaten with only four points scored against them.

The 2008 World Cup was held was held in Australia, with all matches at Sunshine Coast Stadium apart from the final, which was held at Lang Park in Brisbane. Teams from Australia, New Zealand, England, Samoa, Tonga, Pacific Islands, France and Russia participated in the tournament. This was the first tournament in which Great Britain didn't participate, their place being taken by England. It was also the first tournament to feature more than one team from Europe with France and Russia. To date, this is the only tournament that Russia has participated in. New Zealand won the 2008 World Cup defeating Australia 34–0 in the final. Up to this point, New Zealand had won all three world cups that had been held.

The 2013 World Cup was held in England with all four venues being in the county of West Yorkshire. For the tournament, the number of teams was reduced from eight to just four with Australia, New Zealand, England and France taking part. France performed particularly poorly in the competition, conceding 202 points in their three games and scoring just 4. The final was held at Headingley Stadium, Leeds and was contested by Australia and New Zealand. Australia won by a score of 22-12 to win their first world cup.

The 2017 World Cup was held in Australia, with all matches at Endeavour Field in Cronulla, New South Wales apart from the final, which was held at Lang Park in Brisbane, Queensland. The number of teams was increased from the previous tournament to 6. Despite taking part in the previous two tournaments, France did not feature, making England the sole representative of Europe. For the first time in the tournament's history, Canada would take part thus becoming the first team from North America to feature. Canada performed well, beating Papua New Guinea and reaching the semi-finals, eventually losing 58-6 to Australia. For the first time, the final was held as a double-header with the men's World Cup final with Australia defending their title by beating New Zealand by a score of 23-16.

On 18 July 2019, the teams for the 2021 World Cup were announced with the tournament being expanded once again to eight teams. The tournament was be played alongside the men's and wheelchair competitions and took place in England. Teams from England, France, Australia, New Zealand, Cook Islands, Papua New Guinea, Canada and Brazil took part. For the first time, teams from four different continents will play in the competition. The inclusion of Brazil means a team from South America will take part in for the first time in any Rugby League World Cup.

Results

Summary
Australia and New  Zealand have been the most successful teams in the tournaments history, winning all 6 of the 6 World Cups that have been staged between them, with Australia coming out on top in the last three tournaments beating New Zealand in each of the 3 finals.  In two of the finals (2005, 2008) NZ would even prevent their opponents from scoring, with the 2005 final seeing a devastation of the New Zealand Maori team by 58 points. New Zealand in turn would be crushed 54 - 4 by Australia in the 2022 final.

In the first two World Cups, the home nations competed as Great Britain just as they did in the men's equivalent tournament up to the expansion of the competition in 1995.  Since then, England have competed in GB's place.  The 2005 tournament is the only one that has not been run alongside the men's tournament, all of the others taking place at the same time and using some of the same stadiums.  The 2017 final was significant in that it was the first final to be played as a curtain-raiser to the men's final, this final taking place at Suncorp Stadium, Brisbane.

Format
In 2000 three teams participated. There had been an intention that New Zealand Maori would participate as a fourth team, however this did not happen. In 2003 nine teams participated, initially in three groups of three. The top two teams in each pool progressed to a second phase, with the six teams divided into two pools. The bottom three teams from the first phase played a round-robin of consolation matches. After the second phase, the top two teams from each second phase pool entered the semi-finals. 

In 2008, the eight teams was split into two groups of four with the top two of each group progressing through semi-final and final rounds. The 2013 tournament saw a change in the format with the reductions of teams to four meant that there was only one group with the top two qualifying for the final. The following edition saw the return to a two-group format with the six teams being separated in two groups of three with an inter-group game so that they have still played three games as in previous tournaments. The semi-final round will be brought back for this tournament with the bottom team of each group being eliminated at the first stage.

Media coverage

See also

 Women's rugby league
 Men's Rugby League World Cup
 Wheelchair Rugby League World Cup
 Women's Rugby League European Championship
 Women's Rugby World Cup

References

External links
 Women's World Cup set for 2008

 
Women's rugby league competitions
Rugby league international tournaments
Rugby League World Cup
Recurring sporting events established in 2000
Rugby League pages needing cleanup
Quadrennial sporting events
World cups